Irene Mary Steiner Howard (17 June 1903 – December 1981) was a British casting director. Her brothers Leslie Howard and Arthur Howard, and nephew, Alan Howard, became successful actors. She died, aged 78, in Camden Town, North London, England.

Filmography

 Pimpernel Smith (1941)
 In Which We Serve (1942)
 The Gentle Sex (1943)
 The Lamp Still Burns (1943)
 The Way Ahead (1944)
 Henry V (1944)
 Blithe Spirit (1945)
 The Way to the Stars (1945)
 School for Secrets (1946)
 The October Man (1947)
 Hungry Hill (1947)
 Odd Man Out (1947)
 Uncle Silas (1947)
 Edward, My Son (1949)
 The Miniver Story (1950)
 Quo Vadis (1951)
 Ivanhoe (1952)
 Knights of the Round Table (1953)
 Beau Brummell (1954)
 The Adventures of Quentin Durward (1955)
 Bhowani Junction (1956)
 Invitation to the Dance (1956)
 The Barretts of Wimpole Street (1957)
 The Little Hut (1957)
 Barnacle Bill (1957)
 Dunkirk (1958)
 A Touch of Larceny (1959)
 The Scapegoat (1959)
 Libel (1959)
 The Wreck of the Mary Deare (1959)
 Ben-Hur (1959)
 The Day They Robbed the Bank of England (1960)
 Macbeth (1960) (TV)
 Village of the Damned (1960)
 A Matter of WHO (1961)
 The Secret Partner (1961)
 The Green Helmet (1961)
 Invasion Quartet (1961)
 Village of Daughters (1962)
 Postman's Knock (1962)
 Light in the Piazza (1962)
 Four Horsemen of the Apocalypse(1962)
 I Thank a Fool (1962)
 Mutiny on the Bounty (1962)
 Kill or Cure (1962)
 The Password Is Courage (1962)
 Children of the Damned (1963)
 Follow the Boys (1963)
 Come Fly with Me (1963)
 The Haunting (1963)
 In the Cool of the Day (1963)
 Murder at the Gallop (1963)
 Cairo (1963)
 Ladies Who Do (1963)
 Night Must Fall (1964)
 Flipper's New Adventure (1964)
 Murder Ahoy! (1964)
 The Americanization of Emily (1964)
 The Yellow Rolls-Royce (1964)
 The Secret of My Success (1965)
 The Liquidator (1965)
 Lady L (1965)
 Doctor Zhivago (1965)
 The Alphabet Murders (1965)
 Cast a Giant Shadow (1966)
 Hotel Paradiso (1966)
 Blowup (1966)
 Grand Prix (1966)
 La Vingt-cinquième Heure (The 25th Hour) (1967)
 Eye of the Devil (1967)
 Three Bites of the Apple (1967)
 Africa - Texas Style! (1967)
 The Mercenaries (Dark of the Sun) (1968)
 Hot Millions (1968)
 The Shoes of the Fisherman (1968)
 The Fixer (1968)
 Mosquito Squadron (1969)
 Goodbye, Mr Chips (1969)
 Captain Nemo and the Underwater City (1969)
 Hell Boats (1970)
 One More Time (1970)
 The Walking Stick (1970)
 The Going Up of David Lev (1971) (TV)
 The Great Waltz (1972)
 Shaft in Africa (1973)

External links
 

1903 births
1981 deaths
British costume designers
British casting directors
Women casting directors
British Jews
British people of Hungarian-Jewish descent